Edward John Thye (April 26, 1896August 28, 1969) was an American politician. A member of the Republican Party, he was the 26th governor of Minnesota from 1943 to 1947 and a United States Senator from 1947 to 1959.

Early life and education
Edward Thye was born on a farm near Frederick, South Dakota. One of nine children, he was the son of Andrew John and Bertha (née Wangan) Thye. His father, a farmer, was born in Norway and immigrated to the United States in 1872. His brother Ted Thye became a professional wrestler in the Pacific Northwest.

In 1904, Thye and his family moved to Northfield, Minnesota, where he attended local public schools. He took courses at the Tractor and Internal Combustion School in Minneapolis in 1913, and graduated from the American Business College in 1916. After the United States entered World War I, he enlisted as a private in the United States Army Air Corps in 1917. He served overseas in France, and was eventually promoted to second lieutenant.

Early career
After his military service, Thye returned to Minnesota in 1919 and was employed as a tractor expert with the Deere & Webber Company in Minneapolis, becoming a salesman in 1920. He married Hazel Ramage (daughter of Robert and Bertha (Frink) Ramage) in 1921, and the couple remained married until her death in 1936; they had one daughter, Jean Roberta. He continued to work for Deere until 1922, when he became manager and owner of a dairy farm near Northfield.

In 1925, Thye was elected to the town council of Sciota. He later served a number of years on the Sciota school board. He was president of the Dakota County Farm Bureau (1929–1931), director of Twin City Milk Producers Association (1933), and appraiser for the Federal Land Bank of Minnesota (1933–1934). He became friends with Harold Stassen, and actively supported Stassen's campaign for governor of Minnesota in 1938. He subsequently served as the Dairy and Food Commissioner of Minnesota and deputy commissioner of agriculture (1939–1942).

Governor of Minnesota
Thye was elected the 31st lieutenant governor of Minnesota in November 1942. The same month, he was remarried to Myrtle Ennor Oliver; the couple remained married until his death. On April 27, 1943, Stassen resigned to serve in the United States Navy and Thye succeeded him as the 26th governor of Minnesota. He was elected governor in November 1944 by the largest margin ever for a Minnesota gubernatorial candidate.

In the 1944 presidential election, Thye joined U.S. Senator Henrik Shipstead, an isolationist, in supporting Republican nominee Thomas E. Dewey, the governor of New York. Minnesota's other senator at the time, Joseph H. Ball, refused to support Dewey and crossed party lines to back Franklin D. Roosevelt, who won Minnesota's 11 electoral votes.

During his state administration, Thye established the Department of Aeronautics, the Iron Range Rehabilitation Commission, a postwar planning commission, and a human rights commission. He also increased spending for highway construction and unemployment compensation.

U.S. Senate
Thye was elected as a United States Senator in 1946, defeating Henrik Shipstead in the Republican primary and the Democratic-Farmer-Labor nominee Theodore Jorgenson with 58.9% of the vote. He served in the Senate from January 3, 1947, to January 3, 1959, in the 80th, 81st, 82nd, 83rd, 84th, and 85th Congresses. Thye voted for the Civil Rights Act of 1957. He lost his 1958 reelection bid to Eugene McCarthy.

Death
Thye died on August 28, 1969, in Northfield, Minnesota, aged 73. He was buried at the Oaklawn Cemetery in Northfield.

Papers

Thye's papers, including correspondence, speeches, background materials, bills and reports, clippings, campaign literature, and related materials reflecting Thye's public and official activities as U.S. senator from Minnesota, are available for research use.

References

External links
 

1896 births
1969 deaths
People from Brown County, South Dakota
American Lutherans
American people of Norwegian descent
Republican Party governors of Minnesota
Lieutenant Governors of Minnesota
People from Northfield, Minnesota
Military personnel from Minnesota
United States Army officers
United States Army Air Service pilots of World War I
United States Navy personnel of World War II
Republican Party United States senators from Minnesota
Minnesota city council members
School board members in Minnesota
20th-century American politicians
20th-century Lutherans